The Diocese of Marabá  is a Latin Church ecclesiastic territory or diocese of the Catholic Church in Brazil. Its episcopal see is Marabá. The Diocese of Marabá is in the ecclesiastical province of the metropolitan Archdiocese of Belém do Pará.

History
 December 20, 1969: Established as Territorial Prelature of Marabá from the Territorial Prelature of Santíssima Conceição do Araguaia
 October 16, 1979: Promoted as Diocese of Marabá

Bishops

Ordinaries (in reverse chronological order)
 Bishops of Marabá
 Bishop Vital Corbellini (2012.10.10 Oct 2012 - )
 Bishop José Foralosso, S.D.B. (2000.01.12 – 2012.04.25)
 Bishop José Vieira de Lima, T.O.R. (1990.04.18 – 1998.11.11), appointed Bishop of São Luíz de Cáceres, Mato Grosso
 Bishop Altamiro Rossato, C.SS.R. (1985.12.08 – 1989.03.15), appointed Coadjutor Archbishop of Porto Alegre, Rio Grande do Sul
 Bishop Alano Maria Pena, O.P. (1979.10.16 – 1985.07.11), appointed Bishop of Itapeva, São Paulo; future Archbishop
 Prelates of Marabá 
 Bishop Alano Maria Pena, O.P. (1976.11.10 – 1979.10.16); future Archbishop
 Bishop Luís António Palha Teixeira, O.P. (1969.12.20 – 1976.11.10)
 Prelates of Santíssima Conceição do Araguaia
 Bishop Luís António Palha Teixeira, O.P. † (1951.02.20 - 1969.12.20)
 Bishop Sebastião Thomás, O.P. (1924.12.18 - 1945.12.19)
 Bishop Raymond Dominique Carrerot, O.P. † (1912.08.26 - 1920.07.30), appointed Bishop of Porto Nacional, Tocantins

Coadjutor prelates
Tomás Balduino, O.P. (1967); did not succeed to see; appointed Bishop of Goiás
Estêvão Cardoso de Avellar, O.P. (1971-1976); did not succeed to see; appointed Prelate of Santíssima Conceição do Araguaia, Para
Alano Maria Pena, O.P. (1976-1985)

Sources
 GCatholic.org
 Catholic Hierarchy
  Diocese website

Roman Catholic dioceses in Brazil
Christian organizations established in 1969
Maraba, Roman Catholic Diocese of
Roman Catholic dioceses and prelatures established in the 20th century